The Battle of Lexington State Historic Site is a state-owned property located in the city of Lexington, Missouri. The site was established in 1958 to preserve the grounds where an American Civil War battle took place in 1861 between Confederate troops led by Major-General Sterling Price and federal troops led by Colonel James A. Mulligan. The site offers a short battlefield loop trail, picnicking, and tours of the battlegrounds and Oliver Anderson mansion.

See also
List of Missouri state parks
National Register of Historic Places listings in Lafayette County, Missouri

References

External links

 Government

 General information
Battle of Lexington State Historic Site Map Missouri Department of Natural Resources 

1958 establishments in Missouri
Lexington State Historic Site
Lexington State Historic Site
Lexington State Historic Site
Missouri State Historic Sites
Museums in Lafayette County, Missouri
Protected areas established in 1958
Protected areas of Lafayette County, Missouri